"Your Child" is a song by American singer Mary J. Blige. It was written and produced by Gerald Isaac for Blige's fourth studio album, Mary (1999). The song was released by MCA Records as the album's fourth and final single on May 29, 2000 in the United States. A large success on the US Dance Club Songs, "Your Child" peaked at number one. It also reached number twenty-three on the  Hot R&B/Hip-Hop Songs. The accompanying music video for "Your Child" featured Blige performing alongside Harvey White, Joyce Washington, Billie Woodruff and actor Leon Robinson.

Versions

"Your Child" (album version) (5:30)
"Your Child" (Kiyamma Griffin Uptempo mix) (featuring Ghostface) (4:44)
"Your Child" (Kiyamma Griffin's Uptempo mix instrumental) (4:09)
"Your Child" (Chucky Thompson's Late Nite mix) (3:12)
"Your Child" (Junior's Marython mix) (12:05)

Charts

Weekly charts

Year-end charts

References

2000 singles
Mary J. Blige songs
Music videos directed by Bille Woodruff
1999 songs
MCA Records singles
1990s ballads
Songs about infidelity